Grover Mitchell, born Grover Curry Mitchell (March 17, 1930 – August 6, 2003) was an American jazz trombonist who led the Count Basie Orchestra.

Biography
Mitchell was born in Whately, Alabama, but he moved with his parents to Pittsburgh, Pennsylvania, when he was eight. He played the bugle in school and wanted to play trumpet. However, the school band needed a trombonist and reportedly Mitchell's long arms fit the task. He was a member of the school's orchestra with Ahmad Jamal and Dakota Staton. At sixteen, he played with King Kolax's territory band in Indiana.

In 1951 he joined the U.S. Marines and played in a military band. After being discharged in 1953, he moved to San Francisco, where he worked with Earl Hines, Lionel Hampton, and Duke Ellington. From 1962–1970, he was a member of the Count Basie Orchestra. Mitchell had been a fan of Tommy Dorsey, as Count Basie told him he sounded like him. He spent the next decade working in television and movies, then returned to Basie's orchestra in 1980 and remained with it until his death in 1984. Thad Jones became leader of the orchestra, followed by Frank Foster, then Mitchell in 1995.

As bandleader, Mitchell won the Grammy Award for Best Large Jazz Ensemble Album for Live at Manchester Craftsmen's Guild (1996) and Count Plays Duke (1998)

He died of cancer in New York at the age of 73.

Discography

As leader
 Meet Grover Mitchell (Jazz Chronicles, 1979)
 The Devil's Waltz (Jazz Chronicles, 1980)
 Live at the Red Parrot (Hemisphere, 1984)
 Grover Mitchell & His Orchestra (Stash, 1987)
 Truckin ' (Stash, 1987)
 Hip Shakin'  (Ken, 1990)
 Live at Manchester Craftsmen's Guild (1996) with the Count Basie Orchestra
 On Track with his New Blue Devils (Quixotic Records, 1997)
 Count Plays Duke with the Count Basie Orchestra (MAMA, 1998)
 Swing Shift (MAMA/Summit, 1999)
 Grover Mitchell Big Band (Storyville, 2004)

As sideman
With Count Basie 
 On My Way & Shoutin' Again! (Verve, 1962)
 This Time by Basie! (Reprise, 1963)
 More Hits of the 50's and 60's (Verve, 1963)
 Pop Goes the Basie (Reprise, 1965)
 Basie Meets Bond (United Artists, 1966)
 Live at the Sands (Before Frank) (Reprise, 1966 [1998])
 Sinatra at the Sands (Reprise, 1966) with Frank Sinatra
 Basie's Beatle Bag (Verve, 1966)
 Broadway Basie's...Way (Command, 1966)
 Hollywood...Basie's Way (Command, 1967)
 Basie's Beat (Verve, 1967)
 Basie's in the Bag (Brunswick, 1967)
 The Happiest Millionaire (Coliseum, 1967)
 Half a Sixpence (Dot, 1967)
 The Board of Directors (Dot, 1967) with The Mills Brothers
 Manufacturers of Soul (Brunswick, 1968) with Jackie Wilson
 The Board of Directors Annual Report (Dot, 1968) with The Mills Brothers
 Basie Straight Ahead (Dot, 1968)
 How About This (Paramount, 1968) with Kay Starr
 Standing Ovation (Dot, 1969)
 Basic Basie (MPS, 1969)
 Basie on the Beatles (Happy Tiger, 1969)
 High Voltage (MPS, 1970)
 Me and You (Pablo, 1983)
With Gene Ammons
 Free Again (Prestige, 1971)
With Joey DeFrancesco
Where Were You? (Columbia, 1990)
With Al Grey 
 Shades of Grey (Tangerine, 1965)
With Eddie Harris
 How Can You Live Like That? (Atlantic, 1976)
With Oliver Nelson
 Skull Session (Flying Dutchman, 1975)

References

1930 births
2003 deaths
People from Clarke County, Alabama
American jazz trombonists
Male trombonists
Big band bandleaders
Grammy Award winners
Jazz musicians from Alabama
20th-century trombonists
20th-century American male musicians
American male jazz musicians